Evolve is a 2008 documentary television series on History. The series premiere, "Eyes", was nominated for an Emmy for Outstanding Science, Technology and Nature Programming.

Each episode attempts to explain the evolutionary origins of a particular trait of living creatures: for example, Tyrannosaurus rex's 13-inch teeth, the gecko's "Velcro-like" toe pads, and the bald eagle's "telescopic" vision capable of spotting a hare a mile away.

List of episodes
To date, there are 11 episodes, which are available to buy in a compilation box set. The box incorrectly lists 13 episodes but does list the correct 11 episode running time total. Topics are of the episode as named.

The dates of the episodes vary from the different sources available on the internet. The following dates have been compiled from different TV listing websites. Only the airdate of the initial episode is consistent among 4 sources:

Season 1
 "Eyes", Original air date: 29 July 2008
 "Guts", ''Original air date: 5 August 2008
 "Jaws", Original air date: 12 August 2008
 "Sex", Original air date: 19 August 2008
 "Skin", Original air date: 26 August 2008
 "Flight", Original air date: 2 September 2008
 "Communications", Original air date: 14 September 2008
 "Size", Original air date: 8 November 2008
 "Venom", Original air date: 8 November 2008
 "Shape", Original air date: 8 November 2008
 "Speed", Original air date: 26 March 2009

References

External links
 

2008 American television series debuts
2008 American television series endings
2000s American documentary television series
Biological evolution
History (American TV channel) original programming
Documentary films about prehistoric life
Documentary television shows about evolution